Gul Circle MRT station is an elevated Mass Rapid Transit (MRT) station on the East West line (EWL). Located in Tuas, western Singapore, the station serves the surrounding industries of JTC Space @ Tuas and Mapletree Pioneer Logistic Hub. The station is operated by SMRT Trains.

First announced in 2011 as Tuas MRT station, it was constructed as part of the Tuas West Extension (TWE). The station began operations on 18 June 2017. The station has a stacked island platform arrangement with provisions for an MRT extension to Tuas South.

History 

An extension to Tuas from Joo Koon station was first announced in January 2008 by transport minister Raymond Lim to improve public transport access to Tuas and the Jurong Industrial Estate. The station was eventually announced as Tuas station on 11 January 2011, to be constructed as part of the  Tuas West Extension (TWE) of the East West line (EWL). The extension consisted of four stations from Tuas Link to this station.

Contract 1668 for the design and construction of Tuas Station was awarded to Shanghai Tunnel Engineering Co Ltd in November 2011. Construction started at the end of 2011, with a scheduled completion date of 2016. The station was renamed to Gul Circle through a public poll on 13 April 2012.

Initially expected to open in 2016, the TWE completion date was pushed to the second quarter of 2017 to allow more time for the testing of the new signalling system implemented for the extension. As announced by the Land Transport Authority (LTA) on 27 April 2017, the station began operations on 18 June that year. Prior to the station's opening, passengers were offered a preview of the station at an open house on 16 June.

Details

Gul Circle station serves the EWL and is between the Joo Koon and Tuas Crescent stations. The official station code is EW30. Being part of the EWL, the station is operated by SMRT Trains. The station operates between 5:26am and 12:41am. Train frequencies range from 4 to 5 minutes on peak hours and 8 to 9 minutes on non-peak hours.

The three-storey station has a stacked island platform arrangement, with additional side platforms and track provisions for the Tuas South Extension. As of March 2019, however, there were no plans for the south extension due to the lack of developments in Tuas South at the time.

Gul Circle station is located in Tuas along Tuas Road near the junction with Gul Circle and Tuas Avenue 3. Surrounding landmarks of the station include Tuas Fire Station, JTC Space @ Tuas, Mapletree Pioneer Logistic Hub and Raffles Golf Course.

References

External links 

  Official website

Railway stations in Singapore opened in 2017
Mass Rapid Transit (Singapore) stations